Wieler is a surname. Notable people with the surname include:

Diana Wieler (born 1961), Canadian writer
Lothar H. Wieler, (born 1961), German veterinarian and microbiologist 
Michael Wieler (born 1981), German rower
Vic Wieler, Canadian politician

German-language surnames
Russian Mennonite surnames